The 1930 Lehigh Brown and White football team was an American football team that represented Lehigh University during the 1930 college football season. In its third season under head coach A. Austin Tate, the team compiled a 4–5 record.  

The team played its home games at Taylor Stadium in Bethlehem, Pennsylvania.

Schedule

References

Lehigh
Lehigh Mountain Hawks football seasons
Lehigh football